(born February 23, 1929), known professionally as Queta Lavat, is a Mexican actress. She is the sister of actor Jorge Lavat and voice actor José Lavat, and mother of Mexican sports anchor Pablo Carrillo. She is best known for her roles in Las tandas del principal, Cruz de amor and Clase 406.

Early life 
She was born in Mexico City, Queta has six brothers, two of whom were also well known actors, the late Jorge Lavat and José Lavat. Queta's family lived in Colonia Roma de Ciudad de México then later moved to Colonia San Rafael. When she was a young girl, her cousin María Elena Marqués encouraged her to study dance at La Academia Shirley, she later won a talent competition.

Career 
Lavat has many good memories of Jorge Negrete, having made five movies together: Dos tipos de cuidado, Un gallo en corral ajeno, Camino a Sacramento, Tal para cual and Me he de comer esa tuna. Lavat said: "For me it was wonderful to work with those stars, Pedro (Infante) and Jorge. Mr. Negrete, whom I called don Jorge, invited us to have coffee and sweet bread, entertained with conversations of the most at ease. I liked Jorge very well. My only vice has been to always knit and I knitted in my spare time, so Negrete told me: 'You are my little spider, because I have never seen a woman of your age knitting, that is the habit of grandmothers".

She also worked with other famous actors such as Pedro Infante and Irma Dorantes, who continues to be one of her closest friends. The three appeared together in films like Dos tipos de cuidado and Menores de edad.

Lavat's cousin María Elena Marqués was an integral part of her life, it was because of Marqués that she met her husband of 43 years and the father of her four sons. Armando Carrillo. Lavat said "Filming in Acapulco, she told me: I'm going to introduce you to a single, decent, hard working and handsome man. And she was right. We met and things went well. Eight years of dating and 43 years of marriage".

Queta appeared in several episodes of the last season of La Tremenda Corte, junto a Leopoldo Fernández (Tres Patines). In all, her career was composed of 160 films and 38 TV series.

On February 23, 2009, the actress celebrated her 80th birthday surrounded by all her loved ones: brothers, sons, grandchildren, daughters-in-law, her son-in-law, childhood friends as well as acting colleagues. Among those who attended were Luz María Aguilar and Irma Dorantes.

In 2011 Queta appeared in the TV series Amorcito corazón produced by Lucero Suárez, in the role as Sor Pilar. Regarding her career and her future, she speaks plainly: "The only thing I do not want, in any way, is to retire, as long as God grants me lucidity I will continue working, even if I am in a wheelchair".

Filmography

Film

Stage 
Conversations with Mom (Conversaciones con Mamá) (2017)

Awards and nominations

 60th Ariel Awards - Golden Ariel (Ariel de Oro) for her outstanding career in 2018
 Guadalajara International Film Festival (Festival Internacional de Cine en Guadalajara) - Homage for 70-year career in 2017
 Cineteca Nacional - Homage for 70-year career in 2017
 National Association of Actors - Distinctive Medal for 50-year career in 2016
 Goddesses of Silver (Las Diosas de Plata) - Silver Goddess Award for 69 year artistic career in the Golden Age of Mexican cinema in 2014
 Guadalajara International Film Festival (Festival Internacional de Cine en Guadalajara) - Industry Builders Award (Premio Forjadores de la Industria) for 69-year career in 2012
 Choca de Oro - Award for 50 Year Career in 2012
 Association of Latin Entertainment Critics - Premios Ace Award for "Best Supporting Actor in a Telenovela" in 1992, for her portrayal of Brigida in Ángeles blancos

References

External links

Living people
1929 births
Mexican film actresses
Mexican telenovela actresses
Mexican television actresses